Scopelosaurus ahlstromi is a waryfish of the family Notosudidae, found in all oceans, at depths of down to 500 m.  Its length is between 15 and 25 cm.

References
 
 Tony Ayling & Geoffrey Cox, Collins Guide to the Sea Fishes of New Zealand,  (William Collins Publishers Ltd, Auckland, New Zealand 1982) 

Notosudidae
Fish described in 1976